This Is Happening is a 2015 independent film directed by Ryan Jaffe and starring James Wolk, Mickey Sumner, René Auberjonois, Judd Nelson, Cloris Leachman, and Emily Tremaine.

Premise 
This is Happening is an independent film about an estranged brother (James Wolk) and sister (Mickey Sumner) who go on a road trip to find their runaway grandmother.

Cast 
 James Wolk as Philip 
 Mickey Sumner as Megan
 Cloris Leachman as Estelle
 Emily Tremaine as Ashley
 Rene Auberjonois as Cal Plotz
 Judd Nelson as Steven
 Mike Wade as Derek 
 Shabana Shah Groovie's Groupie
 Kenny Apel as Gas Station Loser
 Jakki Jandrell Woman
 J DOC Farrow as Orderly
 Zarin Khan as Mother

Release 
The film saw limited release on October 2, 2015. The film was released for digital download on January 5, 2016.

Critical reception
On review aggregator Rotten Tomatoes, the film holds an approval rating of 43% based on 7 reviews, with an average rating of 5.1/10.

References

External links
 
 
 

2015 films
2010s English-language films